Pseudomogrus is a genus of jumping spiders first described by Eugène Simon in 1937.

Taxonomy
First described by Eugène Simon in 1937, Pseudomogrus was synonymized with Yllenus by Jerzy Prószyński in 1968. In 2016, Prószyński erected a new genus, Logunyllus, for some species of Yllenus. Logunyllus was declared a junior synonym of Pseudomogrus in 2019.

Under the synonym Logunyllus, Prószyński placed the genus in his informal group "yllenines", with Yllenus as a representative genus. In Maddison's 2015 classification of the family Salticidae, Yllenus is placed in the tribe Leptorchestini, part of the Salticoida clade of the subfamily Salticinae.

Species
 it contained the following species:
Pseudomogrus albifrons (Lucas, 1846) — North Africa, Middle East
Pseudomogrus albocinctus (Kroneberg, 1875) — Turkey to China
Pseudomogrus algarvensis (Logunov & Marusik, 2003) — Portugal
Pseudomogrus auriceps (Denis, 1966) — Libya
Pseudomogrus bactrianus (Andreeva, 1976) — Tajikistan
Pseudomogrus bakanas (Logunov & Marusik, 2003) — Kazakhstan
Pseudomogrus bucharaensis (Logunov & Marusik, 2003) — Uzbekistan, Kazakhstan
Pseudomogrus caspicus (Ponomarev, 1978) — Russia (Europe), Azerbaijan, Kazakhstan, Turkmenistan
Pseudomogrus dalaensis (Logunov & Marusik, 2003) — Kazakhstan
Pseudomogrus dumosus Logunov & Schäfer, 2019 — Spain (Canary Islands)
Pseudomogrus gavdos (Logunov & Marusik, 2003) — Canary Is., Algeria, Italy (Sardinia), Greece (Crete)
Pseudomogrus guseinovi (Logunov & Marusik, 2003) — Azerbaijan, Kazakhstan, Turkmenistan
Pseudomogrus halugim (Logunov & Marusik, 2003) — Israel
Pseudomogrus improcerus (Wesolowska & van Harten, 1994) — Yemen
Pseudomogrus knappi (Wesolowska & van Harten, 1994) — Sudan, Yemen
Pseudomogrus logunovi (Wesolowska & van Harten, 2010) — United Arab Emirates
Pseudomogrus mirabilis (Logunov & Marusik, 2003) — Uzbekistan, Turkmenistan
Pseudomogrus mirandus (Wesolowska, 1996) — Turkmenistan
Pseudomogrus nigritarsis (Logunov & Marusik, 2003) — Turkmenistan
Pseudomogrus nurataus (Logunov & Marusik, 2003) — Uzbekistan
Pseudomogrus pavlenkoae (Logunov & Marusik, 2003) — Kazakhstan
Pseudomogrus pseudovalidus (Logunov & Marusik, 2003) — Kazakhstan, Turkmenistan
Pseudomogrus ranunculus (Thorell, 1875) — Algeria
Pseudomogrus saliens (O. Pickard-Cambridge, 1876) — North Africa, Saudi Arabia, Yemen
Pseudomogrus salsicola (Simon, 1937) — France to Israel
Pseudomogrus shakhsenem (Logunov & Marusik, 2003) — Turkmenistan
Pseudomogrus squamifer (Simon, 1881) — Portugal, Spain
Pseudomogrus tamdybulak (Logunov & Marusik, 2003) — Uzbekistan
Pseudomogrus tschoni (Caporiacco, 1936) — Libya, Egypt, Israel, United Arab Emirates
Pseudomogrus univittatus (Simon, 1871) — France, Turkey, possibly Turkmenistan
Pseudomogrus validus (Simon, 1889) — Central Asia to Mongolia
Pseudomogrus vittatus (Thorell, 1875) — Eastern Europe to Kazakhstan
Pseudomogrus zaraensis (Logunov, 2009) — Turkey
Pseudomogrus zhilgaensis (Logunov & Marusik, 2003) — Kazakhstan

References

External links

Salticidae genera
Salticidae